Altemicidin is monoterpene alkaloid first identified in isolates from marine actinomycetes (specifically Streptomyces sioyaensis) in 1989. It may also be produced synthetically.
Altemicidin displays both acaricidal and antitumor activity.

References

Alkaloids
Sulfonamides